New Taipei City Constituency XII includes districts along the northeastern coast of New Taipei City. The district was formerly known as Taipei County Constituency XII (2008-2010) and was created in 2008, when all local constituencies of the Legislative Yuan were reorganized to become single-member districts.

Current district
 Jinshan
 Wanli
 Xizhi
 Pingxi
 Ruifang
 Shuangxi
 Gongliao

Legislators

Election results

 

 
 
 
 
 
 
 
 

2008 establishments in Taiwan
Constituencies in New Taipei